Microtragus luctuosus is a species of beetle in the family Cerambycidae. It was described by Shuckard in 1838. It is known from Australia.

References

Parmenini
Beetles described in 1838